From Dusk till Dawn: The Series is an American horror television series developed by Robert Rodriguez. It forms part of the franchise of film, direct-to-video, and comics of From Dusk till Dawn, expanding on the chronicles of the Gecko Brothers, Seth and Richie; The Fuller family; and Santanico Pandemonium. The series adds to the tone of the film, with new characters and backstories, while expanding the snake creatures' Mesoamerican mythology. The series also references the Popol Vuh, drawing on its rich, mythological history and, in particular, on the legend of the Hero Twins Hunahpú and Xbalanqué to add greater depth to the backstories and to fully flesh out the characters of the show's protagonists, the Gecko Brothers, Seth and Richie.

The series premiered on March 11, 2014, on Rodriguez's newly launched  El Rey Network. Outside the United States and Latin America, the series is marketed as a Netflix original but was removed in November 2022. It was produced by FactoryMade Ventures in association with Miramax and executive produced by Rodriguez.

The third season aired from September 6 to November 1, 2016. While the series was never officially announced as cancelled, Deadline Hollywood reported that the actors were released from their contracts on October 31. El Rey Network ceased all operations on December 31, 2020, making a revival of the show unlikely.

Plot 
In this supernatural crime series, Seth Gecko and his violent, unpredictable brother, Richard "Richie" Gecko, are wanted by the FBI and Texas Ranger Freddie Gonzalez after a bank robbery left several people, including policemen and Gonzalez's mentor Texas Ranger Earl McGraw, dead. Heading for the Mexico border pursued by Gonzalez, the Geckos encounter former minister Jacob Fuller and his family, whom they take hostage by commandeering the Fullers' RV. Drug lord Don Carlos reroutes them to a strip club populated by snakelike people that all must fight for food to survive until dawn.

Cast and characters

Main cast

Recurring cast

Guest stars 

 Season 1
 Lane Garrison as Pete Bottoms
 Joanna Going as Jennifer Fuller
 Collin Fish as Kyle Winthrop
 Edrick Browne as Frost
 James Remar as Gecko father
 William Sadler as Big Jim
 Adrianne Palicki as Vanessa Styles
 Jesse Borrego as Chet, Twister Doorman
 Sam Medina as Razor Charlie

 Season 2
 Brian Cage as Snake Creature
 David Maldonado as Baltazar Ambrose
 Chris Browning as Nathan Blanchard
 Hemky Madera as Lord Celestino Oculto
 Jere Burns as Winchester Greely
 Gabriel Gutierrez as The Arbiter
 Gary Busey as Prospector
 Neal Kodinsky as J.D.
 Danny Trejo as The Regulator
 Demi Lovato as Maia

 Season 3
 Natalie Martinez as Amaru
 José Zúñiga as Lord Emilio
 Lobo Sebastian as Alonzo
 Michael Esparaza as Gecko assistant
 Joseph Gatt as Skull Keeper
 Shad Gaspard as Olmeca
 Gabrielle Walsh as Manola Jimenez
 Jimmy Bennett as Fanglorious Bandmate
 Daniel Zovatto as Tommy
 Alina Vega as Fanglorious Bandmate
 Robert Knepper as Ranger Gary Willet
 Fernanda Andrade as Solaya/Itzpa
 Geno Segers as General Tatuaje

Production 
From Dusk till Dawn is the first scripted original series on Robert Rodriguez's El Rey network. Series creator and showrunner Rodriguez, who also directed the pilot and other episodes, stated the original film is "one of the favorite movies that I did in the past with Quentin Tarantino and one that people still ask us about today. There was so much I wanted to explore in that movie that I didn't get to. And I delved a little deeper into Mesoamerican mythologies and Aztec and Mayan mythologies and where a vampire culture could have existed back then and found fascinating stuff".

International broadcast
In Australia, the series premiered on SBS 2 on July 1, 2014.

In the UK, the series has been broadcast on Spike since January 4, 2016, as From Dusk Till Dawn.

Episodes

Reception 
From Dusk till Dawn has received mostly favorable reviews. Review aggregator site Metacritic has given the first season a "generally favorable" score of 61 out of 100, based on nine critics. 

On another review aggregator site, Rotten Tomatoes, the season holds a 75% rating with an average rating of 6.6 out of 10, based on 16 reviews. It was picked #1 on Entertainment Weeklys Must list and as one of the Hottest New Fiction Shows by The Hollywood Reporter.

Accolades

Music

Season 1 soundtrack 
The soundtrack for season 1, named From Dusk Till Dawn, Season 1 (Music from the Original Series), was released on May 5, 2015, through Chingon Music. The album features music by Robert Rodriguez's band Chingon (tracks 1–6) and series composer Carl Thiel (tracks 7–20).

See also 

 Vampire films
 List of vampire television series

Notes

References

External links 

 
 

2014 American television series debuts
2016 American television series endings
2010s American horror television series
American action television series
2010s American anthology television series
2010s American crime drama television series
American horror fiction television series
English-language television shows
Live action television shows based on films
From Dusk till Dawn (franchise)
Horror fiction television series
Television series by Entertainment One
Television series by Miramax Television
Vampires in television
Works about Mexican drug cartels
Works by Fede Álvarez
Television series set in the 2010s
Television shows filmed in Texas
Television series about the Texas Ranger Division